Siegen Hauptbahnhof is the main station of the town of Siegen, in the German state of North Rhine-Westphalia. It is in close to the modern centre of Siegen, which includes the bus station and the Sieg Carré and City Galerie shopping centres.

History 
The station was opened on 10 January 1861 simultaneously with the opening of the branch line from Siegen to Betzdorf, now part of the Sieg Railway. The Altena–Siegen section of the Ruhr–Sieg line was opened in August 1861.

Jews were deported from Siegen station from 1942 to 1944. This is recalled on a plaque on track 3.

Services 

Today the station has six platform tracks. Track 1 (a dock platform) and track 2 are next to the main station building. The other four tracks are located on the island platform, a through platform and a terminating platform on each side of the platform. Platforms are 38 cm high and the maximum usable length of platforms varies from 118 to 344 m. The station is not wheelchair accessible and has no lifts or escalators. It is planned to modernise the station at a cost of €11.4 million, with work due to be carried out between 2013 and 2017.

The Siegen station is a transport node and connects with the Siegen bus network.

Regional services 
The following regional services serve the station:

Long distance services 
Between 13 December 2009 and 10 December 2011, a EuroCity service ran every morning from Siegen via Giessen, Frankfurt, Stuttgart, Munich and Salzburg to Klagenfurt. One carriage runs directly to Zagreb. The return service from Croatia / Klagenfurt reached Siegen at 21:57. This service was initially limited to two years and was not extended.

Other facilities 

In the station there is a DB travel centre, a McDonald's, a restaurant and a newsstand.

Inconsistencies in the naming of the station 
The Siegen station was not called a Hauptbahnhof (central station) by Deutsche Bahn until 2017. Nevertheless, the term Siegen Hauptbahnhof was used at some signs at the station, on road maps and in on-train announcements. The station was officially renamed to Siegen Hauptbahnhof after the completion of the refurbishment works in December 2017.

Notes

References

External links 
 

Railway stations in North Rhine-Westphalia
Siegen
Buildings and structures in Siegen-Wittgenstein
Railway stations in Germany opened in 1861
1861 establishments in Prussia